Olivier Chaplain (born 6 January 1982 in Paris) is a French rugby union player. His position is Number 8 and he currently plays for FC Grenoble in the Top 14.

References

1982 births
Living people
French rugby union players
Rugby union players from Paris
FC Grenoble players
Rugby union number eights